The Women's Hong Kong squash Open 2011 is the women's edition of the 2011 Hong Kong Open, which is a WSA World Series event Gold (prize money: $74 000). The event took place at the Hong Kong Squash Centre in Hong Kong from 15–20 November. Nicol David won her sixth Hong Kong Open trophy, beating Raneem El Weleily in the final.

Prize money and ranking points
For 2011, the prize purse was $74,000. The prize money and points breakdown is as follows:

Seeds

Draw and results

See also
Hong Kong Open (squash)
Men's Hong Kong squash Open 2011
WSA World Series 2011

References

External links
WISPA Hong Kong squash Open 2011 website
Hong Kong squash Open 2011 Squash Site website

Squash tournaments in Hong Kong
Women's Hong Kong squash Open
Women's Hong Kong squash Open
2011 in women's squash